The 1994 Laurence Olivier Awards were held in 1994 in London celebrating excellence in West End theatre by the Society of London Theatre.

Winners and nominees
Details of winners (in bold) and nominees, in each award category, per the Society of London Theatre.

Productions with multiple nominations and awards
The following 25 productions, including two ballets and two operas, received multiple nominations:

 6: Sweeney Todd
 5: City of Angels, Hysteria, Machinal and The Winter's Tale
 4: Cabaret and Medea
 3: An Absolute Turkey, Arcadia, Oleanna and Tamburlaine the Great
 2: A Christmas Carol, Angels in America: Perestroika, Ariodante, Gloriana, Grease, Herman Schmerman, Jamais Vu, Romeo and Juliet, Stomp, Sunset Boulevard, The Beggar's Opera, The Deep Blue Sea, The Last Yankee and The Life of Stuff

The following four productions received multiple awards:

 4: Machinal and Sweeney Todd
 3: Hysteria
 2: An Absolute Turkey

See also
 48th Tony Awards

References

External links
 Previous Olivier Winners – 1994

Laurence Olivier Awards ceremonies
Laurence Olivier Awards, 1994
Laurence Olivier Awards
Laurence Olivier Awards